The men's moguls event in freestyle skiing at the 2018 Winter Olympics took place from 9 to 12 February 2018 at the Bogwang Phoenix Park, Pyeongchang, South Korea.

In the victory ceremony, the medals were presented by Tricia Smith, member of the International Olympic Committee, accompanied by Dean Gosper, FIS council member.

Qualification

The top 30 athletes in the Olympic quota allocation list qualified, with a maximum of four athletes per National Olympic Committee (NOC) allowed. All athletes qualifying must also have placed in the top 30 of a FIS World Cup event or the FIS Freestyle Ski and Snowboarding World Championships 2017 during the qualification period (July 1, 2016 to January 21, 2018) and also have a minimum of 80 FIS points to compete. If the host country, South Korea at the 2018 Winter Olympics did not qualify, their chosen athlete would displace the last qualified athlete, granted all qualification criterion was met.

Results

Qualification
In the first qualifying round, the ten best athletes directly qualified for the final. Others competed in the second qualification round.

Qualifying 1
 QF — Qualified directly for the final
 QS — Qualified for the semifinal
 Bib — Bib number
 DNF — Did not finish
 DNS — Did not start

Qualifying 2
 QF — Qualified for the final
 Bib — Bib number
 DNF — Did not finish
 DNS — Did not start

Final
The finals were held on 12 February 2018.

Final 1
 Q — Qualified for next round
 DNF — Did not finish

Final 2
 Q — Qualified for next round
 DNF — Did not finish

Final 3

References

Men's freestyle skiing at the 2018 Winter Olympics